Diwan Bahadur Conjeevaram Thiruvenkata Mudaliar (born 1901 or 1902) was an Indian botanist and civil servant who served as Chief Commissioner of Coorg Province from 1949 to 1950. He was the second Indian to hold the post after Ketoli Chengappa and the last before Coorg was inducted as a Part-C state of the Indian Union.

Personal life 

Mudaliar was born to C. Ramanuja Mudaliar in the town of Conjeevaram (now Kanchipuram) in about 1901 or 1902. He married Tilakavathi daughter of Judge C. Jambulinga mudaliar. The couple had two sons , C. T. Gopalakrishnan and C. T. Radhakrishnan and a daughter, Rama Bai Jagadesan.

Later he married  Radha Bai (off sister of Tilakavathi) and the couple had a daughter Devi Choudrani Varadarajan

As Chief Commissioner of Coorg 

Mudaliar became Chief Commissioner of Coorg in March 1949. During his tenure, Mudaliar inaugurated Coorg's first arts and science college at Mercara.

References 

 

Commissioners and Chief Commissioners of Coorg
1900s births
Year of death missing
Kanchipuram